Sir Edward Henry Murray (born 4 May 1958) is a British High Court judge.

Murray was born in Washington, DC, United States and attended St. Anselm's Abbey School in Washington, DC. He completed an MA in philosophy at Trinity College Dublin in 1980 and a JD cum laude at Harvard Law School in 1985. 

In 1986, he was admitted to the New York State Bar and was an associate of Sidley & Austin from 1986 to 1990. In 1992, he was admitted as a solicitor and joined Allen & Overy as an associate, being promoted to partner in 1993 and served in that derivates structure group at the firm until 2013. He is a naturalised UK citizen. Though he did not having a background as an advocate, he was appointed as a recorder in 2009 and a deputy High Court judge in 2013.  

On 1 October 2018, Murray was appointed a judge of the High Court and assigned to the Queen's Bench Division. He took the customary knighthood in the same year. Since 2022, he has been Presiding Judge of the South Eastern Circuit. 

In 1984, he married Andrea Stang, with whom he has one daughter; they later divorced in 2018. In 2019, he married Bina Pandey.

References 

Living people
1958 births
21st-century English judges
Knights Bachelor
Alumni of Trinity College Dublin
Harvard Law School alumni
Naturalised citizens of the United Kingdom
Lawyers from Washington, D.C.
British solicitors
People associated with Sidley Austin